Fred Rosen was a former columnist for the Arts and Leisure Section of The New York Times and a true crime author in the United States. He had also been a frequent commentator in true crime documentaries on Investigation Discovery.

Biography
Rosen was born in Brooklyn, New York and eventually settled down in Florida. He died on December 2, 2020, after a debilitating stroke about a month earlier.

Writing

In his new book Bat Masterson, The First Dreamer, - Oct.2019 RJ Parker Publishing, Rosen shows through his original research that the legendary American Bat Masterson, an Old West lawman and NYC newspaperman was also an illegal alien from Canada, which he covered up his whole life

In 2016, his book Murdering the President: Alexander Graham Bell and the Race to Save James Garfield was released by Potomac Books. Rosen's other published works include Lobster Boy about the murder of Grady Stiles. Rosen gave evidence in the trial against the killer.

His two books for HarperCollins There But For the Grace: Survivors of the 20th Century’s Infamous Serial Killers and When Satan Wore a Cross, were best-sellers at the Doubleday Book Club, Literary Guild, Mystery Guild, and Book-of-the-Month Club. He has written other works of historical non-fiction including Cremation in America, Contract Warriors and Gold!.

Awards
He won the 2005 Library Journal Best Reference Source Award for The Historical Atlas of American Crime.

References

External links
Official site
Fred Rosen at HarperCollins
University of Nebraska Press's Review of Murdering the President

American crime writers
Year of birth missing (living people)
Living people
Writers from Brooklyn
The New York Times columnists
21st-century American non-fiction writers
American newspaper journalists
People with mood disorders